Matthias Koch (born 1 April 1988) is an Austrian football midfielder who currently plays for FC Hard.

References

1988 births
Living people
SK Sturm Graz players
SC Wiener Neustadt players
Austrian footballers
Austrian Football Bundesliga players
Association football midfielders
People from Feldkirch, Vorarlberg
Footballers from Vorarlberg